PU Aurigae is an irregular variable star located in the constellation Auriga. A red giant, it varies by 0.1 magnitude around magnitude 5.64. Located around 560 light-years distant, it shines with a luminosity approximately 1,523 times that of the Sun and has a surface temperature of 3,482 K.

References

M-type giants
Slow irregular variables
Auriga (constellation)
Durchmusterung objects
034269
024738
1722
Aurigae, PU